The 1959 BYU Cougars football team was an American football team that represented Brigham Young University (BYU) in the Skyline Conference during the 1959 NCAA University Division football season. In their first season under head coach Tally Stevens, the Cougars compiled an overall record of 3–7 with a mark of 2–5 against conference opponents, tied for fifth place in the Skyline, and were outscored by a total of 169 to 102.

The team's statistical leaders included Gary Dunn with 223 passing yards, LeGrand Young with 423 rushing yards and 423 yards of total offense, Jack Gifford with 32 points, and Howard Ringwood with 130 receiving yards.

Schedule

References

BYU
BYU Cougars football seasons
BYU Cougars football